The Great Northern Railway (GNR) Class O1 was a class of two-cylinder 2-8-0 steam locomotive designed by Nigel Gresley for heavy freight work and built by the GNR between 1913 and 1919.

History
Gresley designed the O1 2-8-0 for the heavy coal trains on the mainline from Grantham to London, ordering five examples 1913, which were completed at Doncaster in 1914. A further fifteen were ordered in January 1916, but due to the First World War delays were incurred and construction was transferred to the North British Locomotive Company, who delivered the first ten in April 1918, followed by a further five in October and November 1919.

The class was re-designated O3 by the London and North Eastern Railway in 1944.

British Railways
Seventeen examples survived into British Railways ownership in 1948, but all had been withdrawn by 1952.

References

External links 
 LNER encyclopedia

O1
2-8-0 locomotives
Railway locomotives introduced in 1914
Scrapped locomotives
NBL locomotives
Standard gauge steam locomotives of Great Britain
1′D h2 locomotives

Freight locomotives